The Mission Regional Chamber of Commerce (MRCC) is a Canadian non-profit organization that acts as an advocate for economic development in the region and promotes area tourism to visitors and locals.

It serves the businesses of Mission, British Columbia, and acts as a Chamber of Commerce, similar to a Board of Trade.

History
The MRCC was created on June 19, 1893 as B.C.'s fourth Board of Trade by Harry Brown French, an American sent to Mission after the town's founder sold land to a New York railway corporation. French was elected the Board of Trade's first president, and upon its creation the Board took out advertisements in local newspapers, offering a package of free land, free water, free power and property tax exemptions to potential industrialists, as well as offering to construct factories, mills and other commercial buildings at no charge.

In 1946, the Board of Trade suggested that a Strawberry Festival as well as a Soapbox Derby should be held on June 26. The event was successful and visitors travelled from different areas of the Fraser Valley to attend the event. The festival was held annually until 1951, despite an interruption in June 1948 when the Fraser River flooded causing the event to be postponed until July in its third year. In 1951, Langley, BC became the new host of the Strawberry Festival after the decline of berry farming and the increase in employment in the forestry industry in the Mission area.

The organization operated under the name of the Mission City and District Board of Trade until 1961 when its name was changed to the Mission City and District Chamber of Commerce.  That name stuck until 1970 when it was changed to the Mission City Chamber of Commerce. In 1977, it was suggested by the organization's Vice President Dave Kenyon that the Chamber of Commerce should be terminated due to poor attendance and lack of participation by members. The Chamber persevered, avoiding termination, and in 1979 the name was changed for the final time to its present name, the Mission Regional Chamber of Commerce. Since then, the MRCC has continued to serve the businesses of Mission and now houses a visitor centre.

Description
The MRCC describes its mission as to "foster a network for entrepreneurial leaders to partner in representation, communication and education." It acts on behalf of local businesses, and as an unbiased advocacy group, they serve as a direct liaison between their members and the local government. They also provide their members with networking opportunities, group benefits, educational seminars, as well as marketing and advertising opportunities.

The MRCC is a member of the BC Chamber of Commerce. It currently has 450 members and prints a monthly newsletter titled "The Business Track". It hosts the Annual Candlelight Parade, the largest nighttime Christmas Parade in Western Canada and draws approximately 13 000 spectators every year.

The original Mission Soapbox Derby is still held annually by the Mission & District Soapbox Derby Association.

Current President 

The current president of the Chamber is Manny Deol, a realtor with Royal LePage Wheeler Cheam Realty. Manny was born and raised in Mission.

Past Presidents

MASCOT
Stan the Sturgeon is the Ambassador for the Mission BC Visitor Centre.  His primary role is to advise on all up-coming community events and to promote tourism within the region.   This is achieved through social media outlets including Facebook and Twitter.  Stan is regularly booked to attend local events and school field trips.  Find him via Facebook - Mission BC Visitor Centre or Twitter Stansturgeon1

References

External links
 MRCC Website
 Tourism BC Website
 BC Chamber of Commerce Website
 The Canadian Chamber of Commerce Website
 Vancouver Board of Trade

Chambers of commerce in Canada
Organizations based in British Columbia
Mission, British Columbia